The Football Association Community Shield (formerly the Charity Shield, up to and including the 2001 edition) is an annual association football match organised by the Football Association and presently contested between the champions of the Premier League and the winners of the FA Cup. In the event where a club achieves the domestic double, it will go on to face the league runners-up instead. The match is played every August as the "traditional curtain-raiser" and first trophy of the new English domestic football season. Since 1974, all but seven of the matches have been held at either the original or new Wembley stadiums. Stamford Bridge, which was where the inaugural Charity Shield was played in 1908, has hosted the second-most finals with 11.

The format of the competition has been modified many times over the years. The game was initially contested between the champions of the Football League and the Southern Football League from its inception until 1912, after which both professional and amateurs players participated. Following a six-year suspension as a result of the First World War, the competition resumed in 1920 with a game between the champions of the Football League First and Second Divisions. The following year saw the match arrangement changed again to become a match between the Football League champion and the winner of the FA Cup, switching several more times between the amateur/professional and league champion/FA Cup winner matches during the 1920s. From 1930 onwards it settled to a standard fixture between the FA Cup winner and the Football League champion, except on three occasions. In 1950, the England World Cup squad played the England team who toured Canada that summer, while double-winning Tottenham Hotspur played an "F.A. Selected XI" in 1961 that was described by The Times as being an "England team masquerading". A decade later in 1971, Arsenal won the double and opted against contesting the Shield in favour of playing in more profitable friendlies in Europe; Leicester City – the champions of the Second Division – took their place.

Manchester United hold the record for the most victories, winning the competition 21 times since its inception. They also hold the distinction of having the most appearances (30) and most losses (9). Although the Shield has had its share of historical moments – from Eric Cantona's first career hat-trick in 1992, to Manchester United's first loss of 1999 ending a streak of 33 consecutive games without a defeat – it has been dismissed as a ceremonial friendly that is not on par with other domestic honours in terms of prestige. Winning the Shield has proven to be an unreliable indicator of success in the forthcoming season. Since the establishment of the Premier League in 1992, only eight clubs that won the Shield proceeded to become League champions in the same season, the last being Manchester City in 2018–19. Indeed, Gianluca Vialli was sacked only weeks after guiding Chelsea to the victory in the 2000 match, following a lacklustre start to the season. The current holders are Liverpool, who defeated Manchester City 3–1 in the 2022 edition.

Results

{| class="wikitable plainrowheaders"
|+Key
!scope="row" style="text-align:center"|(R)
|Replay
|-
!scope="row" style="text-align:center; background:#FBCEB1"|
|Title was shared after match finished in a draw
|-
!scope="row" style="text-align:center; background:#cedff2"|
|Match decided by penalty shoot-out after full-time
|-
!scope="row" style="text-align:center; background:#ffbbbb"|
|Team was established for this match only
|}

Results by club

Teams shown in italics are no longer in existence, are still in existence but relocated, or were established only for the purpose of playing in these matches.

Notes

ReferencesGeneralSpecific'''

External links
 Official website

FA Community Shield
FA Community Shield